Anne of Austria (22 September 1601 – 20 January 1666) was an infanta of Spain who became Queen of France as the wife of King Louis XIII from their marriage in 1615 until Louis XIII died in 1643. She was also Queen of Navarre until that kingdom was annexed into the French crown in 1620. After her husband's death, Anne was regent to her son Louis XIV, during his minority, until 1651. During her regency, Cardinal Mazarin served as France's chief minister. Accounts of French court life of Anne's era emphasize her difficult marital relations with her husband, her closeness to her son, and her disapproval of her son's marital infidelity to her niece and daughter-in-law Maria Theresa.

Early life

She held the titles of Infanta of Spain and of Portugal (since her father was king of Portugal as well as Spain) and Archduchess of Austria. Despite her Spanish birth, she was referred to as Anne of Austria because the rulers of Spain belonged to the senior branch of the House of Austria, known later as the House of Habsburg, a designation relatively uncommon before the 19th century.

Anne was raised mainly at the Royal Alcazar of Madrid. Unusual for a royal princess, Anne grew up close to her parents, who were very religious. She was raised to be religious too, and was often taken to visit monasteries during her childhood. In 1611, she lost her mother, who died in childbirth. Despite her grief, Anne did her best to take care of her younger siblings, who referred to her with affection as their mother.

Queen of France

At age eleven, Anne was betrothed to King Louis XIII of France. Her father gave her a dowry of 500,000 crowns and many beautiful jewels. For fear that Louis XIII would die early, the Spanish court stipulated that she would return to Spain with her dowry, jewels, and wardrobe if he did die. Prior to the marriage, Anne renounced all succession rights she had for herself and her descendants by Louis, with a provision that she would resume her rights should she be left a childless widow. On 18 October 1615, Louis and Anne were married by proxy in Burgos while Louis's sister, Elisabeth of France, and Anne's brother, Philip IV of Spain, were married by proxy in Bordeaux. These marriages followed the tradition of cementing military and political alliances between France and Spain that began with the marriage of Philip II of Spain to Elisabeth of Valois in 1559 as part of the Peace of Cateau-Cambrésis. Anne and Elisabeth were exchanged on the Isle of Pheasants between Hendaye and Fuenterrabía. She was lively and beautiful during her youth. She was also a noted equestrian, a taste her son, Louis, would inherit. At the time, Anne had many admirers, including the handsome Duke of Buckingham, although her intimates believed their flirtations remained chaste.

Anne and Louis, both fourteen years old, were pressured to consummate their marriage in order to forestall any possibility of future annulment, but Louis ignored his bride. Louis's mother, Marie de' Medici, continued to conduct herself as queen of France, without showing any deference to her daughter-in-law. Anne, surrounded by her entourage of high-born Spanish ladies-in-waiting headed by Inés de la Torre, continued to live according to Spanish etiquette and failed to improve her French.

In 1617, Louis conspired with his favourite Charles d'Albert de Luynes to dispense with the influence of his mother in a palace coup d'état and had her favorite Concino Concini assassinated on 26 April of that year. During the years he was in the ascendancy Luynes attempted to remedy the formal distance between Louis and his queen. He sent away Inés de la Torre and the other Spanish ladies and replaced them with French ones, notably the Princesse of Conti (Louise Marguerite of Lorraine) and his wife Marie de Rohan, with whom he organized court events that would bring the couple together under amiable circumstances. Anne began to dress in the French manner, and in 1619 Luynes pressed the king to bed his queen. Some affection developed, to the point where it was noted that Louis was distracted during a serious illness of the queen.

A series of stillbirths disenchanted the king and served to chill their relations. On 14 March 1622, while playing with her ladies, Anne fell on a staircase and suffered her second stillbirth. Louis blamed her for the incident and was angry with Marie de Rohan, now the Dowager Duchess of Luynes, for having encouraged the queen in what was seen as negligence. Henceforth, the king had less tolerance for the influence that the duchess had over Anne, and the situation deteriorated after the death of her husband Luynes in December 1621. The king's attention was monopolized by his war against the Protestants, while the queen defended the remarriage of her inseparable companion Marie de Rohan, center of all court intrigue, to her lover Claude, Duke of Chevreuse, in 1622.

Louis turned now to Cardinal Richelieu as his advisor, who served as his first minister from 1624 until his death in 1642. Richelieu's foreign policy of struggle against the Habsburgs, who surrounded France on two fronts, inevitably created tension between Louis and Anne, who remained childless for another sixteen years.

Under the influence of Marie de Rohan, the queen let herself be drawn into political opposition to Richelieu and became embroiled in several intrigues against his policies.  Vague rumors of betrayal circulated in the court, notably her supposed involvement, first, with the conspiracies of the Count of Chalais that Marie organized in 1626, and then those of the king's treacherous favorite, Cinq-Mars, who had been introduced to him by Richelieu.

In 1626, the Cardinal placed Madeleine du Fargis as Dame d'atour in the household of the queen to act as a spy, but she was instead to become a trusted confidant and favorite of the queen.  In December 1630, Louis XIII reduced Anne's court and purged a great amount of her favorites as punishment for a plot in which the queen had cooperated with queen dowager Marie de' Medici in an attempt to depose Cardinal Richelieu, and among those fired were Madame de Motteville and Madeleine du Fargis. Queen Anne asked the Cardinal to intervene so that she might keep du Fargis. When he refused, she swore that she would never forgive him. Du Fargis left for Brussels, where her spouse had sided with the king's brother Gaston, Duke of Orléans against the monarch.  After the invasion of Gaston in 1632, letters were discovered from du Fargis to people in Paris describing the plans of a marriage between Gaston and Anne after the death of Louis XIII. Anne was questioned and confirmed that the letters were written by du Fargis, but denied any knowledge of the plans.

In 1635, France declared war on Spain, placing the queen in an untenable position.  Her secret correspondence with her brother Philip IV of Spain was not the only communication she had with the Spanish. She also corresponded with the Spanish ambassador Mirabel and the governor of the Spanish Netherlands. With the assistance of Anne's servant La Porte, who acted as courier, Madeleine du Fargis and Marie de Rohan acted as agents for her secret correspondence and channeled her letters to other contacts. In July 1637, Anne gave 
du Fargis the mission to examine whether there was any truth to the rumor of an alliance between France and England, as this would force Spain to cut off diplomatic connections to France and disturb her network of couriers between the Spanish embassies of Paris and Brussels.

On 11 August 1637, Anne came under so much suspicion that Richelieu issued an investigation.  Her courier La Porte as well as the abbess of Anne's favorite convent Val-de-Grâce (where Anne had written many of her secret letters) were questioned and admitted to having participated in channeling the queen's secret correspondence. Anne initially swore on the Holy Sacrament that she had participated in no illegal correspondence, but finally admitted her guilt on 15 August. On 17 August, Queen Anne was forced to sign covenants regarding her correspondence, which was henceforth open to inspection; she was further banned from visiting convents without permission and was never to be left alone but was always to be in the presence of one of her ladies-in-waiting. This was soon followed up by a purge of her household, where those officials loyal to the queen were replaced by those loyal to the king and the Cardinal. Consequently, count Jean de Galard de Bearn de Brassac, known to be loyal to Richelieu, was appointed chamberlain of her household, and his spouse Catherine de Brassac replaced Marie-Catherine de Senecey as her Première dame d'honneur to keep the queen and her household under control.

Conventual Patronage and the Val-de-Grâce
As part of her role as a member of French royalty, Anne visited churches and convents across France, where she met Marguerite de Veny d'Arbouze at the Notre-Dame-de-Grâce de la-Ville-d'Evêque. As well as securing from the King the position of Abbess at the Benedictine Val-de-Grâce de Notre-Dame-de-la-Crèche for Marguerite in 1618, Anne purchased lands and transferred the convent to Paris in 1621. She was named the new foundress of the convent in the same year. Her patronage included the building of a small church and an apartment for herself between 1620 and 1625, against the wishes of both Louis and Cardinal Richelieu.

The Val-de-Grâce was commissioned by Anne in 1645, which was undertaken initially by Francois Mansart, who was dismissed in 1646 and succeeded by Jacques Lemercier. The Val-de-Grâce became Anne's main place of worship and would later gain dynastic significance during the Fronde when Anne was Queen Regent. In 1662, Anne acquired the heart of her ancestor, Anne Elizabeth of France, and placed it in the Chapel of Saint Anne. She, herself, was interred in 1666 in the Chapel of Saint Sacrament, alongside the body of Marguerite d'Arbouze.

Birth of an heir

Despite a climate of distrust, the queen became pregnant once more, a circumstance that contemporary gossip attributed to a single stormy night that prevented Louis from travelling to Saint-Maur and obliged him to spend the night with the queen. Louis XIV was born on 5 September 1638, an event that secured the Bourbon line. At this time, Anne was 37. The official newspaper Gazette de France called the birth "a marvel when it was least expected".

The birth of a living son failed to re-establish confidence between the royal couple. However, she conceived again fifteen months later. At Saint-Germain-en-Laye on 21 September 1640, Anne gave birth to her second son, Philippe I, Duke of Orléans, who later founded the modern House of Orléans. Both of her children were placed under the supervision of the royal governess Françoise de Lansac, who was disliked by Anne and loyal to the king and the cardinal.

Richelieu made Louis XIII a gift of his palatial hôtel, the Palais Cardinal, north of the Louvre, in 1636, but the king never took possession of it. Anne left the Louvre Palace to install herself there with her two small sons and remained as regent, hence the name Palais-Royal that the structure still carries.

Regent of France

Upon Louis' death in 1643, Anne was named regent, despite his attempts to prevent her from obtaining the position. With the aid of Pierre Séguier, she had the Parlement de Paris revoke the will of the late king, which would have limited her powers. Their four-year-old son was crowned King Louis XIV of France. Anne assumed the regency but to general surprise entrusted the government to the chief minister, Cardinal Mazarin, who was a protégé of Cardinal Richelieu and figured among the council of the regency. Mazarin left the Hôtel Tubeuf to take up residence at the Palais Royal near Queen Anne. Before long he was believed to be her lover, and, it was hinted, even her husband.

With Mazarin's support, Anne overcame the aristocratic revolt, led by Louis II de Bourbon, Prince de Condé, that became known as the Fronde. In 1651, when her son Louis XIV officially came of age, her regency legally ended. However, she kept much power and influence over her son until the death of Mazarin.

In January 1648, while acting as regent, Anne received a request on behalf of artists who were affiliated with the crown or aristocracy. The artists, led by painter Charles Le Brun, wanted independence from the monopoly control of the guild, which fined the artists or seized their work. The painters and sculptors petitioned Louis XIV and the Queen Regent to form a new organization. They wanted to found an academy that would be for the visual arts what Académie Française was for French literature; this was to become the Académie Royale.

Later life

Anne's regency formally ended in 1651, when Louis XIV was declared of legal majority at the age of thirteen.

In 1659, the war with Spain ended with the Treaty of the Pyrenees. The following year, peace was cemented by the marriage of the young King to Anne's niece, the Spanish Habsburg princess Maria Theresa of Spain.

In 1661, the same year as the death of Mazarin, an heir to the throne was born, Anne's first grandchild Louis. Many other children would follow, but all in the legitimate line would die except for Louis. Sometime after, Anne retired to the convent of Val-de-Grâce, where she died of breast cancer five years later.

Issue
The couple had the following children:

In fiction 
She is one of the central figures in Alexandre Dumas's 1844 novel The Three Musketeers and its sequels Twenty Years After (1845) and The Vicomte de Bragelonne (1847-1850), and has thus been portrayed in numerous film adaptations.

Her lady-in-waiting Madame de Motteville wrote the story of the queen's life in her Mémoires d'Anne d'Autriche.

She was portrayed by Alexandra Dowling in the BBC series The Musketeers (2014–2016).

She first appears as a character in the Dinosaur King season two episode "The French Conniption" as a young teen along with a young King Louis and others.

She appeared in Legends of Tomorrows season two premiere episode "Out of Time", played by Rebecca Roberts.

She appeared in final episode of the third season of series As If, played by Yeşim Ceylan.

Ancestry

Gallery

References

Footnotes

Sources
 Dulong, Claude (1980). Anne d'Autriche, mère de Louis XIII. Paris: Hachette. . Paris: Perrin (2008 paperback): .
 Freer, Martha Walker (1864). The Married Life of Anne of Austria, Queen of France, 2 volumes. London: Tinsley Brothers. Vols 1 & 2 at Google Books.
 Kleinman, Ruth (1987). Anne of Austria: Queen of France. Ohio State University Press. .
 La Varende, Jean de (1938). Anne d' Autriche: femme de Louis XIII. Paris: Les Éditions de France. . 2014 reprint: .
 Mallick, Oliver (2011). "Freundin oder Gönnerin? Anna von Österreich im Spiegel ihrer Korrespondenz", in: Freundschaft. Eine politisch-soziale Beziehung in Deutschland und Frankreich, 12.–19. Jahrhundert (8. Sommerkurs des Deutschen Historischen Instituts Paris in Zusammenarbeit mit der Universität Paris-Sorbonne, der Albert-Ludwigs-Universität Freiburg und der École des hautes études en sciences sociales, 3.–6. Juli 2011), ed. by Bertrand Haan, Christian Kühner (discussions, 8). Online at perspectivia.net
 Mallick, Oliver (2013). "Clients and Friends: The Ladies-in-waiting at the Court of Anne of Austria (1615–1666)", in The Politics of Female Households. Ladies-in-Waiting across Early Modern Europe, ed. by Nadine N. Akkerman, Birgit Houben, Leiden: Brill, p. 231–264.
 Mallick, Oliver (2016). "Au service de la reine. Anne d'Autriche et sa maison (1616–1666)", in: www.cour-de-france.de. Online at cour-de-france.fr
 Mallick, Oliver (2016). 'Spiritus intus agit'. Die Patronagepolitik der Anna von Österreich 1643–1666. Berlin: De Gruyter.
 Robiquet, Paul (1912). Le coeur d'une Reine. Anne d'Autriche, Louis XIII et Mazarin. Paris: Felix Alcan. Copy at Hathitrust.
 Vignal Souleyreau, Marie-Catherine (2006). Anne d' Autriche: La jeunesse d' une souveraine. Paris: Flammarion.

External links 

 
An expansive portrait gallery of Anne of Austria and her husband Louis XIII

French queens consort
Louis XIII
Queen mothers
Regents of France
1601 births
1666 deaths
Alexandre Dumas characters
Austrian princesses
French memoirists
Navarrese royal consorts
Portuguese infantas
Spanish infantas
People from Valladolid
Burials at the Basilica of Saint-Denis
Deaths from breast cancer
Deaths from cancer in France
17th-century women rulers
17th-century French people
17th-century French writers
17th-century Spanish women writers
17th-century memoirists
Countesses of Barcelona
People of the Fronde
Castilian infantas
Aragonese infantas
Spanish people of Austrian descent
Anne of Austria
Daughters of kings